Terrorism in the Grip of Justice or Terrorism in the hands of Justice is a primetime television reality show that began broadcast by the Al Iraqiya network from right before the January 2005 national elections. It features footage of forced confessions of guilt from Iraqis captured by the Iraqi Army or U.S. Military.

External links
 Christian Science Monitor - Iraqi reality-TV hit takes fear factor to another level
 Salon.com
(Washington Post)
(Camera / Iraq)
(International Herald Tribune)

Iraqi television shows
2000s documentary television series
2000s Iraqi television series